Hail the Woman is a 1921 American silent drama film directed by John Griffith Wray. Produced by Thomas Ince, it stars Florence Vidor as a woman who takes a stand against the hypocrisy of her father and brother, played by Theodore Roberts and Lloyd Hughes respectively.

Plot
Oliver Beresford is a controlling and uncompromisingly rigid father. When shameful stories about his daughter Judith surface, he bans her from his house. Her brother David is training for the ministry at his father's insistence, but he has secretly wed Nan Higgins, the stepdaughter of an odd-jobs man, and has fathered a child. Oliver Beresford, learning the truth, buys the silence of the odd-jobs man who then evicts the pregnant Nan from his home. Nan travels to New York where she becomes a prostitute after the baby is born. Seeking a career, Judith also goes to New York where she finds Nan and her baby just as the young woman is dying. Judith decides to raise the child, and later she returns to New England, on the day that David is to be ordained, and confronts him with the child in front of the congregation.

Cast
 Florence Vidor as Judith Beresford
 Lloyd Hughes as David Beresford
 Theodore Roberts as Oliver Beresford
 Gertrude Claire as Mrs. Beresford
 Madge Bellamy as Nan Higgins
 Tully Marshall as "Odd Jobs Man"
 Vernon Dent as Joe Hurd
 Edward Martindel as Wyndham Gray
 Charles Meredith as Richard Stuart
 Mathilde Brundage as Mrs. Stuart
 Eugene Hoffman as The Baby
 Muriel Frances Dana as David Junior

Preservation status
Complete copies of the film survive. The Library of Congress holds a 35mm nitrate negative and a 35mm acetate master positive. The film is also preserved in the archives of the Museum of Modern Art in New York as well as in the Cinematheque Royale de Belgique in Brussels.

References

Further reading

External links

1921 films
American black-and-white films
1921 drama films
American silent feature films
Films directed by John Griffith Wray
Silent American drama films
1920s American films